Dylan Chellamootoo (born 22 January 1995) is a French taekwondo practitioner. He won one of the bronze medals in the –63 kg event at the 2019 Summer Universiade held in Naples, Italy.

Career 

In 2013, he competed in the men's flyweight at the World Taekwondo Championships in Puebla, Mexico. He was eliminated in his third match by Damián Villa of Mexico. A year later, he won one of the bronze medals in the −58 kg event at the 2014 European Taekwondo Championships held in Baku, Azerbaijan.

He represented France at the 2015 European Games in Baku, Azerbaijan in the men's 58 kg event without winning a medal. He was eliminated in his first match by Max Cater of Great Britain. The following year, he competed at the 2016 European Taekwondo Olympic Qualification Tournament hoping to qualify for the 2016 Summer Olympics in Rio de Janeiro, Brazil. He won his first match but he was then eliminated in his next match by Ron Atias of Israel. In 2018, he competed in the men's 68 kg event at the Mediterranean Games without winning a medal. He was eliminated from the competition in his second match, against Hakan Reçber of Turkey.

In 2019, he competed in the men's bantamweight event at the World Taekwondo Championships in Manchester, United Kingdom where he was eliminated in his first match by Korai Murakami of Japan. At the 2019 Military World Games held in Wuhan, China, he won the silver medal in the –63 kg event.

References

External links 
 

Living people
1995 births
Place of birth missing (living people)
French male taekwondo practitioners
Taekwondo practitioners at the 2015 European Games
Medalists at the 2019 Summer Universiade
Universiade medalists in taekwondo
Universiade bronze medalists for France
European Taekwondo Championships medalists
Mediterranean Games competitors for France
Competitors at the 2018 Mediterranean Games
21st-century French people